Songs from The Tree House is a 1995 album by Canadian singer and songwriter Martha Johnson. It was released through Muffin Music and was produced by Johnson and Mark Gane. Songs from The Tree House won a Juno Award for Best Children's Album in 1997.

Track listing
 Into The Tree House (Martha Johnson) (1:05)
 Everboy Needs A Home (Martha Johnson/Mark Gane) (1:47)
 My Little Sister (Martha Johnson) (1:43)
 When You Grow Up (Martha Johnson) (2:39)
 It Was An Accident (Martha Johnson) (1:33)
 Beautiful Trees (Martha Johnson)  (2:10)
 The Golden Rule (Martha Johnson) (3:01)
 The Itsy Bitsy Spider (Traditional, arranged by (Martha Johnson/Mark Gane) (1:16)
 The Wind (Martha Johnson) (0:50)
 White Coral Bells (Traditional, arranged by (Martha Johnson)  (0:58)
 My Best Friend (Martha Johnson)  (1:51)
 Don't Give Me Those Beans (Martha Johnson) (2:27)
 I Made It Myself (Martha Johnson) (2:09)
 Are We There Yet (Martha Johnson) (1:08)
 Row Row Row Your Boat (Traditional, arranged by (Martha Johnson)  (1:10)
 The Shang Yang (The Rainbird) (Martha Johnson) (2:06)
 Sailing Through The Night (Martha Johnson) (2:55)
 Shooting Stars (Martha Johnson) (2:17)
 Goodnight From The Tree House (Martha Johnson) (1:07)

Reception
AllMusic gave a favorable review for the album, commenting that it was "a wonderful children's album that neither children nor parents will tire of hearing."

References

1995 albums
Martha Johnson (singer) albums
Juno Award for Children's Album of the Year albums